A gold IRA or precious metals IRA is an Individual Retirement Account in which physical gold or other approved precious metals are held in custody for the benefit of the IRA account owner. It functions the same as a regular IRA, only instead of holding paper assets, it holds physical bullion coins or bars. Precious metals IRAs are usually self-directed IRAs, a type of IRA where the custodian allows more diverse investments to be held in the account.

The four precious metals allowed to be held in an individual retirement account are gold, silver, platinum and palladium, provided they are in the form of IRS-approved coin or bar products. Since gold is the most commonly purchased of the four, the overarching term "gold IRA" is used most often as industry slang to mean a retirement account containing any combination of precious metals. Other terms such as, "precious metals IRA", "silver IRA", "platinum IRA", or "palladium IRA" are also frequently used.

Investors often use precious metals as a long-term hedge against inflation, to diversify their portfolio. Internal Revenue Code requirements state that the approved precious metals must be stored in a specific manner. Some trustees have their own facilities to hold the physical precious metals, while others use a third party metals depository as a storage facility.

History 
The Taxpayer Relief Act of 1997 broadened the permissible types of investments allowed in IRAs, stating: "Your IRA can invest in one, one-half, one-quarter, or one-tenth ounce U.S. gold coins, or one-ounce silver coins minted by the Treasury Department. Beginning in 1998, an IRA can invest in certain platinum coins and certain gold, silver, palladium, and platinum bullion."

IRA-accepted precious metals 
The IRS approves select precious metals and forms of bullion for IRAs. Although investment in "Collectibles" using IRAs and Qualified Plans is not allowed, there is a carve-out allowing for investment in certain coins, as well as bullion meeting certain fineness requirements. Gold bars are more difficult to sell due to their higher price and easier ability to be counterfeited, as well as being more difficult to deliver due to their heaviness and the amount of security required during transport. There are currently a variety of precious metals that meet the minimum purity requirements that are acceptable for inclusion into a gold IRA account. Some gold IRA companies argue inclusion of certain coins in a precious metals IRA; however, several of those companies have been investigated by the government for misleading customers and aggressively selling numismatic coins over gold bullion. Numismatic coins pay the gold company higher commissions, but bullion bars more directly reflect the spot price of the precious metal.

Gold 
 American Gold Eagle bullion coins
 American Gold Eagle proof coins
 British Gold Britannia coins (from 2013)
 British The Queen's Beasts (coin)
 British gold Shēngxiào Lunar Series (British coin)
 Canadian Gold Maple Leaf coins
 Austrian Gold Philharmonic coins
 Australian Kangaroo/Nugget coins
 Chinese Gold Panda coins
 American Gold Buffalo uncirculated coins (proofs not allowed)
 Gold bars and rounds produced by a NYMEX or COMEX-approved refinery or national government mint, meeting minimum fineness requirements.

Silver 
 American Silver Eagle bullion coins
 American Silver Eagle proof coins
 British Silver Britannia coins (from 2013)
 British The Queen's Beasts (coin)
 British silver Shēngxiào Lunar Series (British coin)
 Canadian Silver Maple Leaf coins
 Austrian Silver Philharmonic coins
 Australian Silver Kookaburra coins
 Chinese Silver Panda coins
 Mexican Libertad coins
 Silver bars and rounds produced by a NYMEX or COMEX-approved refinery or national government mint, meeting minimum fineness requirements

Platinum 
 American Platinum Eagle coins
 American Platinum Eagle proof coins
 British The Queen's Beasts (coin)
 British Britannia (coin) (from 2018)
 Canadian Platinum Maple Leaf coins
 Isle of Man Noble coins
 Australian Platinum Koala coins
 Platinum bars and rounds produced by a NYMEX or COMEX-approved refinery or national government mint, meeting minimum fineness requirements

Palladium 
 American Palladium Eagle bullion coins
 Canadian Palladium Maple Leaf coins
 Palladium bars and rounds produced by a NYMEX or COMEX-approved refinery or national government mint, meeting minimum fineness requirements

Receiving distributions 
The laws for taking distributions from a gold IRA are the same as those for a regular IRA. The account holder may liquidate their IRA metals for cash or take physical possession of them. Both actions are akin to taking an IRA distribution and will be taxed accordingly.

Storage 
To comply with IRS requirements, all IRAs, including precious metals IRAs, must leave their assets in possession of a trustee or custodian, not the owner's individual possession. IRS Publication 590 specifies that for all IRAs, "The trustee or custodian must be a bank, a federally insured credit union, a savings and loan association, or an entity approved by the IRS to act as trustee or custodian." All nonbank IRA trustees must demonstrate to the IRS that they will meet Treasury standards of accounting, auditing, reporting, and asset security.

Several companies promote gold IRA arrangements based on the checkbook control strategy, where the IRA does not own the metals directly, but owns a limited liability company (LLC) through which the taxpayer purchases and stores the metals. Neither the IRS nor federal courts have taken a position on the legality of these arrangements, and the IRS has warned that they carry a risk of disqualifying the IRA.

References

External links 
Individual Retirement Arrangements (IRAs) (IRS)
Retirement Plans: FAQs regarding IRAs (IRS)

Individual retirement accounts
Gold investments
Tax-advantaged savings plans in the United States